In nonlinear control and stability theory, the Popov criterion is a stability criterion by Vasile M. Popov for the absolute stability of a class of nonlinear systems whose nonlinearity must satisfy an open-sector condition. While the circle criterion can be applied to nonlinear time-varying systems, the Popov criterion is applicable only to autonomous (that is, time invariant) systems.

System description 
The sub-class of Lur'e systems studied by Popov is described by:

 

where x ∈ Rn, ξ,u,y are scalars, and A,b,c and d have commensurate dimensions. The nonlinear element Φ: R → R is a time-invariant nonlinearity belonging to open sector (0, ∞), that is, Φ(0) = 0 and yΦ(y) > 0 for all y not equal to 0.

Note that the system studied by Popov has a pole at the origin and there is no direct pass-through from input to output, and the transfer function from u to y is given by

Criterion 
Consider the system described above and suppose
A is Hurwitz
(A,b) is controllable
(A,c) is observable
d > 0 and
Φ ∈ (0,∞)

then the system is globally asymptotically stable if there exists a number r > 0 such that

See also 
 Circle criterion

References 
 

Nonlinear control
Stability theory